The Alfa Romeo 115 was an Italian six-cylinder air-cooled inverted inline engine for aircraft use, mainly for training and light planes, based on the de Havilland Gipsy Six engine. Production totalled approximately 1,600 units.  Derivatives of the 115 include the -1, bis, ter and Alfa Romeo 116.

Description
The Alfa Romeo 115 series of engines closely follows the original de Havilland Gipsy Six engines in having one-piece Elektron casting crankcases with cover plates, steel cylinders, finned for cooling, and detachable aluminium alloy cylinder heads. The six-throw one-piece counterbalanced crankshaft is carried in seven plain journal bearings and the propeller is driven directly by the crankshaft.

Variants
110ter 

4-cylinder version of the 115ter
115-1  (115-I)
115bis (115-2 / 115-II) 
115ter (115-3 / 115-III) 
116-1 (116-I) The 115 bored out to  developing  at 2,360 rpm, otherwise similar.

Applications

Ambrosini SAI.3
Bestetti BN.1 (one prototype)
Breda Ba.75 (prototypes)
Breda Ba.79S
CANT Z.1012 (or 110)
Caproni Ca.164
Nardi FN.305
Nardi FN.315
Saiman 200
Ambrosini SAI.2S (115-1)
Caproni Ca.309 Ghibli (115bis)
Fiat G.46-1B (115bis)
Fiat G.46-3B (115bis)
Fiat G.46-4B (115bis)
Ambrosini S.7 (115ter)
Fiat G.46-A (115ter)
Fiat G.46-3A (115ter)
Fiat G.46-4A (115ter)

Specifications (115-1)

See also

Notes

References 

 

115
Air-cooled aircraft piston engines
1930s aircraft piston engines
Inverted aircraft piston engines
Straight-six engines